Basilar may refer to:

 Basilar artery
 Basilar artery migraines
 Basilar crackles
 Basilar crest
 Basilar membrane
 Basilar part of occipital bone
 Basilar part of pons
 Basilar plexus
 Basilar sinus
 Basilar skull fracture
 Basilar sulcus of the pons